Kartasura (also spelled Kartosuro) is a district (kecamatan) in Sukoharjo Regency, Central Java, Indonesia. Kartasura is considered as a Surakarta's satellite city, and a junction of highways to Yogyakarta and Semarang. It can be reached within minutes southward of Surakarta's Adisumarmo International Airport.

History 

In the seventeenth century Kartasura was the capital of the Sultanate of Mataram between 1680 and 1755. It is commonly referred to as the Kartasura era or period of the Mataram sultanate—it preceded the transfer to Surakarta by Pakubuwana II.

There were considerable problems for the sultanate in this era: 
 A difficult relationship with the Dutch East India Company (VOC)
 The issues of succession, such as Treaty of Giyanti (1755)
 The Geger Pecinan, Chinese rebellion which burnt the palace (1743)

Heritage sites 
There are 2 palace sites, Kartasura Palace at Kartasura subdistrict (kelurahan) and Pajang Palace ruin at Makamhaji subdistrict.

References

Further reading 
 Miksic, John N. (general ed.), et al. (2006) Karaton Surakarta. A look into the court of Surakarta Hadiningrat, central Java (First published: 'By the will of His Serene Highness Paku Buwono XII'. Surakarta: Yayasan Pawiyatan Kabudayan Karaton Surakarta, 2004) Marshall Cavendish Editions Singapore 
 Pemberton, John, (1994) On the subject of "Java" Ithaca : Cornell University Press.
 Ricklefs, M.C. (1978) Modern Javanese historical tradition: A study of an original Kartasura chronicle and related materials. London : School of Oriental and African Studies.
 Ricklefs, M.C. (1993) War, culture and economy in Java, 1677–1726: Asian and European imperialism in the early Kartasura period. Sydney : Asian Studies Association of Australia in association with Allen and Unwin.

Districts of Central Java
 
1680 establishments in Indonesia